George William Rusden (9 July 1819 – 23 December 1903) was an English-born historian, active in Australia.

Early life
Rusden was born in Leith Hill Place (near Dorking), Surrey, England, son of the Rev. George Keylock Rusden, M.A. (1784-1859) and his wife Anne, née Townsend. G.K. Rusden was a polyglot and mathematician who kept a private school for 23 years in Surrey before migrating with his family to New South Wales where he was appointed a chaplain at Maitland from 1 January 1835.

Australia
George William Rusden travelled with his family to Australia and befriended Charles Nicholson on the voyage. Rusden was at first employed on the land, and was soon managing properties. At 28 years of age Rusden travelled to China and worked for a time at brother-in-law Ellis Gilman's Canton factory. Rusden visited his brother Alfred who was a tea-taster in Shanghai before returning to Sydney in early 1849.

In 1849 Rusden became an agent for the establishment of national schools in the Port Phillip district and later at Moreton Bay. He was appointed under-secretary in the colonial secretary's office at Melbourne in 1851, clerk of the executive council in 1852, and clerk of the Victorian Legislative Council in 1856. He retained his interest in education as a member of the council of the University of Melbourne from its inception, and was largely responsible for the foundation of the Shakespeare scholarship. In 1871 he published The Discovery, Survey and Settlement of Port Phillip, an interesting pamphlet of some 60 pages. Three years later his Curiosities of Colonization appeared. This consists largely of accounts of Maurice Margarot, one of the "Scottish Martyrs", and Joseph Holt, the Irish rebel general. Both of these pamphlets are very scarce.

Return to England
In 1882 Rusden retired to England on a pension of £500 a year. He had for some time been working on his History of Australia and his History of New Zealand, which were published in 1883, each in three volumes. Rusden made great use of the library of Edward Petherick even staying for weeks at the latter's home in Brixton Hill, London, where the book collection was stored. Unfortunately for Rusden he had accepted statements, made by a bishop in New Zealand and forwarded by a governor of the colony, without verifying them. These reflected on the conduct of John Bryce, a well-known politician in New Zealand, who brought an action for damages and obtained a verdict for £5000. On an appeal for reduction of damages in which Rusden conducted his own case with great ability (see his Tragedies in New Zealand, privately printed 1888), the parties to the suit came to an agreement, that Bryce should be paid £3675 in satisfaction of all claims. In 1888 Rusden published his Aureretanga; Groans of the Maoris, and a new edition of his History of New Zealand appeared in 1895. The second edition of the History of Australia was published in 1897 and his last work, William Shakespeare, was in the press at the time of his death. It is largely a collection of extracts from the plays with a running commentary. In addition to the works already mentioned, Rusden published some verse, Moyarra: An Australian Legend, 1851, second edition 1891, and Translations and Fragments, published c. 1876. He also published several pamphlets. Rusden returned to Australia on medical advice in January 1893 and lived in South Yarra. Rusden died in Melbourne on 23 December 1903.

Legacy
Rusden was conservative in his politics and neither of his histories is free from bias; he had no access to the Historical Records of Australia of which 33 volumes have since been published.

A house at Melbourne Grammar School has been named in honour of Rusden, and was established in 1914 after he bequeathed the school £2000 and the bulk of his manuscripts. The house is known as Rusden House, and its colour is yellow.

Families
A younger brother, Henry Keylock Rusden, born in 1826, joined the Victorian civil service in 1853. He was secretary of the Royal Society of Victoria for several years and published many pamphlets.

Books
(1891)  Moyarra: An Australian Legend in Two Cantos London:E.A.Petherick

References

1819 births
1903 deaths
Australian people of English descent
19th-century Australian historians